Kévin Valleray (born 12 June 1988), known by his stage name Kalash, is a Martinican-born French rapper and singer mixing trap music and Caribbean influences. Kalash is a reference to the Russian Kalashnikov rifle. He is also famous for his collaborations with French rap and hip hop artists notably Booba and Admiral T. His album Kaos released on 6 May 2016 on Capitol Records / Universal Music Group reached number 4 on the French SNEP albums chart.

Discography

Album

Singles

Other songs

Featured in

References

1988 births
Living people
French rappers
French people of Martiniquais descent
Martiniquais musicians
Musicians from Strasbourg